Jordi Cinca Mateos (born in Andorra la Vella, 26 July 1965) is an Andorran politician who was Minister of Finance between 2011 and 2019.

He was named in the 2016 Panama Papers leak.

References

1965 births
Living people
Finance Ministers of Andorra
Government ministers of Andorra
Democrats for Andorra politicians
People named in the Panama Papers
People from Andorra la Vella